Sutton Ings is a suburb of Kingston upon Hull, in the East Riding of Yorkshire, England. It was served by Sutton-on-Hull railway station. It is near the larger area of Sutton-on-Hull.

Amenities 
Sutton Ings has a library, a post office, and a few schools.

References
 Philip's Navigator Britain (page 298)
 Philip's Street Atlas (page 141)

Wards and districts of Kingston upon Hull